Elections to Inverclyde Council were held on 3 May 2012, the same day as the other 31 local authorities in Scotland. The election used the six wards created as a result of the Local Governance (Scotland) Act 2004, with each ward electing three or four Councillors using the single transferable vote system form of proportional representation, with 20 Councillors being elected in total.

The election saw Labour Councillors remain the largest party as they gained 1 additional seat to hold half the seats on the Council. The Scottish National Party also increased their representation by 1 seat and remained in second place on the authority. The Scottish Liberal Democrats remained in third place but lost half of their seats, falling from 4 seats to 2. The Independent and Scottish Conservative and Unionist Party retained their solitary seats on the authority.

Following the election the Labour Party again formed a minority administration this time with the support of the Independent and the Conservative Party Councillors.

Results 

Note: "Votes" are the first preference votes. The net gain/loss and percentage changes relate to the result of the previous Scottish local elections on 3 May 2007. This may differ from other published sources showing gain/loss relative to seats held at dissolution of Scotland's councils.

Ward results

Inverclyde East
2007: 1xLab; 1xSNP; 1xCon; 1xLib Dem
2012: 2xLab; 1xCon; 1xSNP
2007-2012: Lab gain one seat from Lib Dem

Inverclyde East Central
2007: 2xLab; 1xSNP 
2012: 2xLab; 1xSNP
2007-2012: No change

Inverclyde North
2007: 2xLab; 1xSNP; 1xLib Dem
2012: 2xLab; 1xSNP; 1xLib Dem 
2007-2012: No change

Inverclyde South
2007: 2xLab; 1xSNP
2012: 2xLab; 1xSNP
2007-2012: No change

Inverclyde West
2007: 1xIndependent; 1xLab; 1xLib Dem
2012: 1xIndependent; 1xLab; 1xSNP
2007-2012: SNP gain from Lib Dem

Inverclyde South West
2007: 1xSNP; 1xLab; 1xLib Dem
2012: 1xLab; 1xSNP; 1xLib Dem
2007-2012: No change

References

http://www.andrewteale.me.uk/pdf/2012/inverclyde12.pdf

Changes since the 2012 elections
† On 13 September 2014 Inverclyde South Labour Cllr Vaughan Jones resigned from the party and became an Independent in opposition to her party's stance on the Scottish Independence Referendum. 

2012 Scottish local elections
2012